A geologic province is a spatial entity with common geologic attributes. A province may include a single dominant structural element such as a basin or a fold belt, or a number of contiguous related elements.  Adjoining provinces may be similar in structure but be considered separate due to differing histories.

Geologic provinces by origin

Geologic provinces by resources

Some studies classify provinces based upon mineral resources, such as mineral deposits.  There are a particularly large number of provinces identified worldwide for petroleum and other mineral fuels, such as the Niger Delta petroleum province.

See also
 Physiographic province
 Geomorphology
 United States Geological Survey

References

External links
Geologic Province Map of the World (NASA)
Definitions for the Geologic Provinces (USGS)